KARV-FM (101.3 FM) is a radio station licensed to Ola, Arkansas, United States. The station is currently owned by Bobby Caldwell's EAB of Russellville, LLC.

References

External links

ARV-FM
Radio stations established in 1998
1998 establishments in Arkansas
Country radio stations in the United States